3MT may refer to:
 3-Methoxytyramine, a metabolite
 3MT (radio station), an Australian radio station
 3MT Venue, a theatre in Manchester, England
 Three Minute Thesis, an academic competition for PhD students